"It's You" is a song by Iraqi–Canadian singer and songwriter Ali Gatie, released as a single through Li$n and Warner Records on June 14, 2019. It debuted at number 97 on the US Billboard Hot 100 and peaked at number 70, becoming Gatie's first Hot 100 entry.

Background
According to Gatie, "It's You" was written in 15 minutes. The song was written about his feelings for a girl. Speaking on the conception of the song, he said he was "just feeling the words in that moment and speaking from the heart". The night he wrote the song, he played it on his Instagram Live and people reacted positively to it, recording it and uploading the recording to YouTube. The song quickly gained huge popularity and Gatie attributes this popularity to the "big impact" the song had when it was officially released.

Gatie said the song is about "being vulnerable and trying not to let the fear of heartbreak overcome the joy of love". Billboard described it as Gatie "somberly pleading for a second chance at love despite his jaded past".

Music video
The song's official video was released on July 18, 2019. According to Gatie, the video showcases love in all of its forms and represents "every person or situation that 'It's You' could be for each listener". He described the video as "very diverse" and showcasing "love in different ways".

Reception
Billboard magazine called the video "intimate" and noted how Gatie's mixture of cultures is displayed throughout: "Gatie riding in the backseat of a car, but the couples shown throughout come from a range of ethnicities and are of various ages".

Charts

Weekly charts

Year-end charts

Certifications

Release history

See also
 List of number-one songs of 2019 (Malaysia)

References

2019 songs
2019 singles
Ali Gatie songs
Number-one singles in Malaysia
Songs written by Happy Perez
Songs written by Pop Wansel